"Days Like This" is a song written by Northern Irish singer-songwriter Van Morrison and the title song of his 1995 album of the same name. Morrison has often performed this song in concert appearances,and it has become one of his most popular songs from his later years. Despite peaking at #65 in the UK, it reached positions #17 and #12 on the Billboard US (on the LyricFind and the Rock Digital Song Sales charts respectively). In Ireland, "Days Like This" peaked at #1 on the radio airplay chart in 2022.

Recording and composition
"Days Like This" was recorded during the 1993–1994 sessions at Wool Hall Studios, Beckington and the Real World in Bath, Somerset. The song was inspired by the 1961 Shirelles hit "Mama Said", written by Luther Dixon and Willie Denson.

Before making his big break as a solo artist, Irish singer-songwriter Brian Kennedy performed backing vocals for this song, as well as others throughout the album, and features heavily in the music video.

Legacy
It became the official anthem of the peace movement in Northern Ireland and the Northern Ireland Office used it along with "Brown Eyed Girl" as theme music for a television advertisement promoting the ceasefire. Morrison performed it for an audience of 60–80,000 people when President Bill Clinton visited Belfast, Northern Ireland on 30 November 1995. Clinton, himself a saxophonist, had shown an appreciation for Morrison's music and had wanted to perform but was advised against it by security officers.

In 2020 Irish singer Dermot Kennedy released a cover version on his album Without Fear: The Complete Edition.

In the media
In 1997 "Days Like This" was featured on the soundtrack of the film As Good as It Gets. It was played several times in the 2007 film Because I Said So. It has also been used in a Channel 7 Australia ad campaign.

In episode 2 of season 4 of the Netflix Money Heist television series, the song is played.

Morrison has often performed this song in concert appearances, including at the Austin City Limits Music Festival.

Other releases
Live at Austin City Limits Festival  (2006 Limited Cd)
Van Morrison at the Movies - Soundtrack Hits
The Best of Van Morrison Volume 3
Still on Top - The Greatest Hits (remastered in 2007)

Personnel
 

Van Morrison – vocals, alto saxophone
Ronnie Johnson – electric guitar
Nicky Scott – bass
Geoff Dunn – drums
Teena Lyle – piano, backing vocals
Kate St John – alto saxophone
Pee Wee Ellis – tenor saxophone
Leo Green – tenor saxophone
Matthew Holland – trumpet
Brian Kennedy – backing vocals
Horns arranged by Pee Wee Ellis

Notes

References
Heylin, Clinton (2003). Can You Feel the Silence? Van Morrison: A New Biography, Chicago Review Press, 
Hinton, Brian (1997). Celtic Crossroads: The Art of Van Morrison,  Sanctuary, 
Rogan, Johnny (2006). Van Morrison: No Surrender, London:Vintage Books  

1995 singles
Van Morrison songs
Songs written by Van Morrison
Song recordings produced by Van Morrison
Mercury Records singles